John James Sweeney (born June 1, 1927) is a former member of the Pennsylvania State Senate, serving from 1975 to 1978.

References

1927 births
Possibly living people
Politicians from Philadelphia
Democratic Party Pennsylvania state senators